Hayton is a village in Nottinghamshire, England. It is located 4 miles north-east of Retford. According to the 2001 census it had a population (including Tiln) of 386, decreasing marginally to 385 in the 2011 Census.
The parish church of St Peter is Norman, with 14th century windows.

References

External links

Villages in Nottinghamshire
Civil parishes in Nottinghamshire
Bassetlaw District